Daniel Torres Samaniego (born June 9, 1991) is a Mexican competition swimmer who specializes in the backstroke.  He is the current Mexican record holder in the 50-meter backstroke.

Career

Torres was born in Chihuahua, Mexico in 1991, the son of Gerardo Torres and Cristy Samaniego. He is a 2010 graduate of COBACH 3 high school and 2015 graduate of the University of the Incarnate Word, where he majored in international business. Swimming for the Incarnate Word Cardinals, he earned seven individual and four relay CSCAA All-American honors over two years at the NCAA Division-II level.

At the 2015 Pan American Games, Torres was a finalist in the 100-meter backstroke and as a member of the 4x100-meter medley relay.

Personal bests
.

Key:  NR = National record

See also
 List of Mexican records in swimming

References

External links
 

1991 births
Mexican male butterfly swimmers
Sportspeople from Chihuahua (state)
Pan American Games competitors for Mexico
Swimmers at the 2015 Pan American Games
Mexican male backstroke swimmers
Living people